Ballyards was a halt at the Ballyards Rd. level crossing on the Castleblayney, Keady and Armagh Railway in Northern Ireland.

The station opened on 1 December 1909. and closed on 1 February 1933.

References

Disused railway stations in County Armagh
Railway stations opened in 1909
Railway stations closed in 1932
Railway stations in Northern Ireland opened in the 20th century